Yuanbao may refer to:

Places or structures

Mainland China

Yuanbao District (元宝区), in Dandong, Liaoning
Yuanbao, Shangzhi (元宝镇), town in Shangzhi, Heilongjiang
Yuanbao Township (元宝乡), Qing'an County, Heilongjiang

Taiwan
Yuanbao Temple, in Taichung

Others
Sycee, also known as Yuanbao, a type of silver or gold ingot currency used in China until the 20th century